In mathematics, a Δ-set S, often called a Δ-complex or a semi-simplicial set, is a combinatorial object that is useful in the construction and triangulation of topological spaces, and also in the computation of related algebraic invariants of such spaces. A Δ-set is somewhat more general than a simplicial complex, yet not quite as general as a simplicial set.As an example, suppose we want to triangulate the 1-dimensional circle . To do so with a simplicial complex, we need at least three vertices, and edges connecting them.

Definition and related data
Formally, a Δ-set is a sequence of sets  together with maps

whenever .

It is not as general as a simplicial set, since it lacks "degeneracies."

Given Δ-sets S and T, a map of Δ-sets is a collection of set-maps

such that

whenever both sides of the equation are defined.

With this notion, we can define the category of Δ-sets, whose objects are Δ-sets and whose morphisms are maps of Δ-sets.

Each Δ-set has a corresponding geometric realization, defined as

where we declare that

 

Here,  denotes the standard n-simplex, and

is the inclusion of the i-th face.  The geometric realization is a topological space with the quotient topology.

The geometric realization of a Δ-set S has a natural filtration
 
where

is a "restricted" geometric realization.

Related functors
The geometric realization of a Δ-set described above defines a covariant functor from the category of Δ-sets to the category of topological spaces.  Geometric realization takes a Δ-set to a topological space, and carries maps of Δ-sets to induced continuous maps between geometric realizations.

If S is a Δ-set, there is an associated free abelian chain complex, denoted , whose n-th group is the free abelian group
 
generated by the set , and whose n-th differential is defined by

 

This defines a covariant functor from the category of Δ-sets to the category of chain complexes of abelian groups.  A Δ-set is carried to the chain complex just described, and a map of Δ-sets is carried to a map of chain complexes, which is defined by extending the map of Δ-sets in the standard way using the universal property of free abelian groups.

Given any topological space X, one can construct a Δ-set  as follows.  A singular n-simplex in X is a continuous map

 

Define

 

to be the collection of all singular n-simplicies in X, and define

by

where again  is the -th face map.  One can check that this is in fact a Δ-set.  This defines a covariant functor from the category of topological spaces to the category of Δ-sets.  A topological space is carried to the Δ-set just described, and a continuous map of spaces is carried to a map of Δ-sets, which is given by composing the map with the singular n-simplices.

Examples
This example illustrates the constructions described above. We can create a Δ-set S whose geometric realization is the unit circle , and use it to compute the homology of this space.

The only possible maps  are

It is simple to check that this is a Δ-set, and that .  Now, the associated chain complex  is

where

In fact,  for all n.  The homology of this chain complex is also simple to compute:

All other homology groups are clearly trivial.

The following example is from section 2.1 of Hatcher's Algebraic Topology. Consider the Δ-set structure given to the torus in the figure, which has one vertex, three edges, and two 2-simplices.

The boundary map  is 0 because there is only one vertex, so . Then , so  , and hence 

Since there are no 3-simplices,  .

So . Clearly  for 

Thus,  

It is worth highlighting that the minimum number of simplices needed to endow  with the structure of a simplicial complex is 7 vertices,  21 edges, and 14 2-simplices, for a total of 42 simplices. This would make the above calculations, which only used 6 simplices, much harder for someone to do by hand.

This is a non-example. Consider a line segment. This is a 1-dimensional Δ-set and a 1-dimensional simplicial set. However, if we view the line segment as a 2-dimensional simplicial set, in which the 2-simplex is viewed as degenerate, then the line segment is not a Δ-set, as we do not allow for such degeneracies.

Abstract nonsense 
We now inspect the relation between Δ-sets and simplicial sets. Consider the simplex category , whose objects are the finite totally ordered sets  and whose morphisms are monotone maps. On the other hand, consider the subcategory  of  whose morphisms are only the strict monotone maps.

whenever . Thus, a presheaf on  determines the data of a Δ-set and, conversely, all Δ-sets arise in this way.

From this persepective, it is now easy to see that every simplicial set is a Δ-set. Indeed, notice there is an inclusion ; so that every simplicial set  naturally gives rise to a Δ-set, namely the composite .

Pros and cons 
One advantage of using Δ-sets in this way is that the resulting chain complex is generally much simpler than the singular chain complex.  For reasonably simple spaces, all of the groups will be finitely generated, whereas the singular chain groups are, in general, not even countably generated.

One drawback of this method is that one must prove that the geometric realization of the Δ-set is actually homeomorphic to the topological space in question.  This can become a computational challenge as the Δ-set increases in complexity.

See also
Simplicial complexes
Simplicial sets
Singular homology

References

 
 
 

Topology
Algebraic topology
Simplicial sets